The 2021–22 season is the 17th in the history of the Central Coast Mariners Football Club. This is the Central Coast Mariners' 17th season in the A-League. In addition to the domestic league, Central Coast also participated in the FFA Cup.

Players

Transfers

Transfers in

From academy squad

Transfers out

Contract extensions

Pre-season and friendlies

Competitions

Overview

A-League Men

League table

Regular season

Finals series

FFA Cup

Team statistics

Appearances and goals
Numbers in parentheses denote appearances as substitute.

See also
 2021–22 in Australian soccer
 List of Central Coast Mariners FC seasons

References

External links
 Central Coast Mariners official website

Central Coast Mariners FC seasons
2021–22 A-League Men season by team